William Ethelbert Mason (1866 – August 24, 1951) was a businessman and political figure in Saskatchewan, Canada. He was mayor of Regina from 1925 to 1926.

He was born in Toronto and came to Regina in 1905 to open a branch of the Canada Permanent Mortgage Corporation. In 1891, he had married Helen Agnes Cockburn. In 1920, he retired from that job and opened the W. E. Mason Discount Company. Mason was also head of the Prudential Trust Company. He served as Regina's first magistrate.

His daughter, who served as a nurse in England during World War I, died of the Spanish flu.

References

Mayors of Regina, Saskatchewan
1866 births
1951 deaths